Trat is a town in Thailand, capital of Trat Province and the Mueang Trat district.

Trat may also refer to:
Trat Province
Mueang Trat District
Trat River
Trat Airport